Babići is a village in the municipality of Gračanica, Bosnia and Herzegovina.

Demographics 
According to the 2013 census, its population was 1,897.

References

Populated places in Gračanica